Ralph C. Johnson (December 17, 1953 – March 15, 2016) was an American politician and businessman.

Born in New York City, New York, Johnson graduated from North Carolina Agricultural and Technical State University and was in the home improvement business in Greensboro, North Carolina. Johnson served as a Democratic member of the North Carolina House of Representatives from 2015 until his death in 2016. He represented the 58th district. Johnson was African-American. Johnson died in a hospital in Greensboro, North Carolina after suffering a stroke.

References

External links

NC Policy Watch-The Class of 2015-Rep. Ralph C. Johnson

1953 births
2016 deaths
Politicians from Greensboro, North Carolina
Politicians from New York City
North Carolina A&T State University alumni
Businesspeople from Greensboro, North Carolina
Democratic Party members of the North Carolina House of Representatives
African-American state legislators in North Carolina
21st-century American politicians
20th-century American businesspeople
20th-century African-American people
21st-century African-American politicians